The Chiappa Triple Crown is a family of Italian made triple-barrel, break-action shotguns, chambered in 12-gauge, 20-gauge, 28-gauge, and .410-bore. The barrels have a triangular arrangement with one on top and two below. This gives the Triple Crown a single barrel sight picture.

Triple Crown
The Triple Crown shotguns are triple-barrel, break-action shotguns, chambered in 12-, 20-, 28- and .410-gauge. The 12-, 20-, and .410 gauge models will accept 3 inch Magnum shells and the 28- gauge model will accept 2 3/4 inch shells. The 12 gauge model has 28 inch barrels, while all of the other models have 26 inch barrels. The barrels have a triangular arrangement with one on top and two below. This gives the Triple Crown a single barrel sight picture. The barrels accept standard Rem-Choke style choke tubes and it comes with 5 choke tubes ranging from Improved Cylinder to Full Choke. It uses a single trigger and has a manual safety on the tang behind the action lever. The Triple Crown may be disassembled for ease of storage.

Triple Threat
The Triple Threat shotguns are the shorter 18½-inch models chambered in both 12-, 20- and .410-gauge 3-inch Magnums. They feature a unique two-piece removable butt-stock design allowing them to be shortened to an overall length of 27¾ inches.

Triple Threat BLK
The Triple Threat BLK comes in 12-gauge 3-inch Magnum only. It features Picatinny rails on the top barrel and below the bottom barrels. This allows for this model to use a wide range of optical sights and tac-lights. It also features black plastic furniture. Although, unlike the basic model, the BLK uses a standard butt-stock that cannot be shortened.

See also 
 Chiappa Little Badger Deluxe Shotgun
 Chiappa Double Badger
 Chiappa M6 Survival Gun
 Combination gun

References

External links 
 Official website
 YOUTUBE video: Chiappa Triple Crown
 YOUTUBE video: Chiappa Triple Threat at the Range
 YOUTUBE video: Chiappa Triple Threat 12 Gauge

Chiappa Firearms
Shotguns of Italy
Multiple-barrel firearms